Dorothy Bellew (8 August 1891 – 29 October 1973) was an English actress. She appeared in around sixty films during the silent era, including the title role in Lorna Doone (1912).

Selected filmography

References

Bibliography 
 Klossner, Michael. The Europe of 1500-1815 on Film and Television: A Worldwide Filmography of Over 2550 Works, 1895 Through 2000. McFarland & Company, 2002.

External links 

 

1891 births
1973 deaths
English stage actresses
English film actresses
English silent film actresses
20th-century English actresses
Actresses from London